Schuke is a surname, especially of a German family of organ builders.

 Alexander Schuke (1870–1933), organ builder, founder and manager of Alexander Schuke Potsdam Orgelbau (1884)
 Hans-Joachim Schuke (1908–1979), organ builder
 Matthias Schuke (born 1955), organ builder
 Karl Schuke (1906–1987), organ builder

Surnames